Alex Outhred (born 1977) was an Australian actor. He starred as a young pubescent boy going through a sexual awakening in the 1992 Australian film, Hammers Over the Anvil.

His character has polio, and following a long line of actors who won awards for playing disabled people, he won awards for his performance. Outhred won the Australian Film Institute Young Actors Award. His co-star, Russell Crowe, one-upped him several years later for playing someone with schizophrenia.

Ann Turner, the director, praised Outhred's ability to feign admiration with regular smiles and distant dreamy looks.

He now works as a research scientist.

References

External links
Hammers Over the Anvil press kit (PDF)

Australian male film actors
1977 births
Living people